Era University is a private state university established in 2016 by the Era Educational Trust in Lucknow, Uttar Pradesh. The university offer courses in the fields of medical and allied and paramedical sciences, nursing, pharmacy, basic science, biotechnology, food and nutrition, liberal arts, MHA and computer application. It is the parent institute of Era's Lucknow Medical College.

Notable faculty
Rajendra Prasad, Dr. B. C. Roy Award laureate (2010)

Location
The University campus is located at Sarfarazganj, Hardoi Road, Lucknow.

References

Private universities in Uttar Pradesh
Universities and colleges in Lucknow
Pharmacy colleges in Uttar Pradesh